First Dutch Reformed Church, also known as the "Old Church on the Green", is located in Hackensack, New Jersey.

History
It sits in the churchyard of the church by the same name, the current building being constructed in 1791. The east wall of the building is of particular interest because it incorporates several carved stones from the first church building erected on the site. These stones bear the monogram of several of the founding families. The Congregation was founded by Dutch Settlers in 1686. For the first ten years the congregation worshipped in various locations, and in 1696 the first building was built on the current site. In 1780 Colonial General Enoch Poor was buried in the Cemetery. George Washington and the Marquis de Lafayette attended the funeral. The church is the oldest extant church in Bergen County.

The church is adjacent to the Hackensack Green, which was originally church land and is one of the oldest public squares in New Jersey.

Notable burials
 Adam Boyd (1746–1835) represented New Jersey in Congress from 1803 to 1805, and again from 1808 to 1813.
 George Cassedy (1783–1842), represented New Jersey in Congress from 1821 to 1827.
 Enoch Poor (1736–1780), one of George Washington’s officers.
 Richard Varick (1753–1831), former mayor of the city of New York and former New York Attorney General

See also 
 Bergen County Cemeteries

References

External links 

 Dutch Reformed Church Cemetery, The Political Graveyard
 

Dutch-American culture in New Jersey
Churches on the National Register of Historic Places in New Jersey
Cemeteries in Bergen County, New Jersey
Protestant Reformed cemeteries
Churches in Bergen County, New Jersey
Hackensack, New Jersey
Churches completed in 1791
Reformed Church in America churches in New Jersey
National Register of Historic Places in Bergen County, New Jersey
Historic districts on the National Register of Historic Places in New Jersey
New Jersey Register of Historic Places
18th-century churches in the United States
1686 establishments in New Jersey